"With Him Tonight" is a single by Dutch girl group Luv'. This song performed in English and Spanish was released on July 4, 2019. Luv' had not put out new material since the All You Need Is Luv' album in 1994. "With Him Tonight" was recorded by the original members Marga Scheide and José Hoebee as well as Chimène van Oosterhout (who replaced Ria Thielsch).

Background and release

In March 2016, Marga Scheide and José Hoebee announced the comeback of Luv' in De Telegraaf. Ria Thielsch (who had already replaced Patty Brard in 1980) was part of this reunion. Between 2016 and 2018, Luv' toured the nostalgia circuit in the Netherlands and Belgium. The group intended to record a new repertoire produced by Juan Cristóbal Losada. However, nothing materialized. 

On January 4, 2019, Luv' informed that Dutch media personality Chimène van Oosterhout had replaced Ria Thielsch. In May 2019, on the initiative of Henk Schorel, CEO of the multimedia company Viva Canal, the trio went to Miami to record a Latin pop-reggaeton single entitled "With Him Tonight" with producers Keith Morrison and Manuel Garrido-Lecca. In addition to the recording sessions, Luv' took part in photo shoots and also gave interviews on Spanish-speaking channels based in Florida (WWHB-CD, Mega TV, Beach Channel and Space Coast TV).

"With Him Tonight" premiered at Luv's fan club meeting in Best on June 30, 2019. On July 2, 2019, the audio of the track was posted on YouTube. On July 3, 2019, Luv' revealed their latest single during an exclusive interview on De Telegraaf web channel. The song was released the following day.

Credits and personnel

Song written by Periko and Jessie Leon
Producers and Developers: Henk Alberto Schorel, Keith Morrison, Manuel Garrido-Lecca for Solid Gold Music Productions
Marga Scheide, José Hoebee, Chimène van Oosterhout - vocals
Ernesto Hermoza - Guitar Espanola, Palmas
Agustin Espina - Keyboards
Keith Morrison - Sound Design, Arrangements
Manuel Garrido-Lecca - Drum Programming, Keyboards 
Eduardo Olive - Palmas
Engineering in Lima, Peru by Eduardo Olive - EOG Producciones
Engineering in the Legend Sound Wellington, Florida, USA by Keith Morrison
Mixed by Keith Morrison at Kokopelli Sound Studio Redland, Florida, USA
Mastered by Mike Fuller at FullerSound Davie, Florida, USA
Additional vocals (Chimène van Oosterhout) recorded by Dennis Mulder at D-Recording, Amsterdam, Netherlands

Track listing
Digital download/streaming
"With Him Tonight" – 3:24

References

2019 singles
2019 songs
Luv' songs
Spanglish songs
Reggaeton songs
Latin pop songs